Elections for the City of Glasgow District Council took place on 3 May 1977, alongside elections to the councils of Scotland's various other districts. These were the second elections to the City of Glasgow District Council, and saw Labour losing their control of the council, losing nearly half of their councillors. Among the losing councillors was Dick Dynes, the Labour group leader. Dynes was replaced as leader by Jean McFadden.

While Labour still had the largest number of councillors, the party decided not to try retain power rejecting the possibility of coalition deals with either the Conservatives or the SNP. This paved the way for the Conservatives to form a minority administration, although they also refused to work with the SNP. The SNP group leader Frank Hannigan, reacted angrily to Labour's decision and called on their councillors to resign. He argued they had "ratted on their own voters" by handing power to the Conservatives who had won just 28% of the vote. This meant what would happen at the first meeting of the council was uncertain

When the Council met on 9 May SNP abstentions meant that Labour's nominee David Hodge was elected Lord Provost of Glasgow over the Conservatives' Jack Richmond. As the Conservatives had said that they would only form an administration if their candidate was elected as Lord Provost, this caused an uncertain situation. Ultimately Richmond urged his colleagues to form an administration nonetheless and they eventually agreed to do this after an internal vote among the Conservative group. However it was noted in The Glasgow Herald that many of their policies, including the sale of council houses, were unlikely to be supported by the majority on the council.

Ultimately the Conservative administration proved unstable and resigned in September 1979, paving the way for a minority Labour administration to take over. In 1980 The Glasgow Herald cliamed that the three years of political uncertainty since the 1977 election meant Glasgow District Council had "gained an unenviable reputation for chaos and outrageous behaviour among its members". It further branded the situation "the longest running comedy show in the city" with one notorious incident seeing a Conservative councillor hiding in a chimney-piece during a meeting to "confuse a vote".

Aggregate results

Ward results

References

1977
Glasgow District Council
District Council election, 1977